Harris Turner (October 3, 1887 – 1972) was a journalist and political figure in Saskatchewan. He was a soldier's representative in the Legislative Assembly of Saskatchewan from 1917 to 1921 and then represented Saskatoon City in the assembly from 1921 to 1925 as an independent member.

He was born in Markdale, Ontario, the son of Adam Turner and Mary E. Black, and was educated in Orangeville. In 1917, Turner married Alice M. Moyer. He served with the Princess Patricia's Canadian Light Infantry during World War I and was wounded, losing the sight in both eyes. Turner served as leader of the opposition in the Saskatchewan assembly from 1924 to 1925. He was defeated when he ran for reelection as a Progressive in 1925. Turner served on Saskatoon city council from 1929 to 1930.

Turner and A.P. "Pat" Waldron founded Turner's Weekly and then The Western Producer (first known as The Progressive), weekly newspapers in Saskatoon.

References 

1887 births
1972 deaths
Independent MLAs in Saskatchewan